Oleg Vladimirovich Sibalov (born 11 April 1988) is a Russian professional football player. He plays for FC Blagoveshchensk.

Club career
He played in the Russian Football National League for FC Amur Blagoveshchensk in 2005.

External links
 Career summary by Sportbox
 

1988 births
Living people
Russian footballers
Association football forwards
FC Amur Blagoveshchensk players